Mirae Asset Financial Group is a financial services group headquartered in Seoul, South Korea. Mirae Asset provides comprehensive financial services including asset management, wealth management, investment banking, and life insurance. Mirae Asset was founded by Hyeon Joo Park in 1997 and introduced the very first mutual funds to Korean retail investors in 1998. On a global consolidated basis, total group’s client assets exceed US$550 billion (as of December, 2020). Mirae Asset has global presence in Australia, Brazil, Canada, Mainland China, Hong Kong, Colombia, India, Indonesia, Japan, Korea, Mongolia, Singapore, the United Kingdom, United States and Vietnam.

Harvard Business School selected Mirae Asset Financial Group as its first Asian financial company case study in 2010, under the title “Mirae Asset: Korea’s Mutual Fund Pioneer". Seoul National University also selected Mirae Asset Financial Group as one of their case studies, "Mirae Asset: A Disruptive Innovator in the Korean Financial Industry", which is listed by The Case Centre case method clearinghouse.

History

Foundation of Mirae Asset Financial Group 

Park Hyeon-Joo founded Mirae Asset Global Investments and Mirae Asset Capital in June 1997.  Within 6 months after the foundation, Mirae Asset suffered from 1997 financial crisis of South Korea, however, showed a tremendous investment performance by believing in South Korea's economy to rebound with contrary investment insights where Park is notable for his adherence to long-term and value investing.

In December 1998, Park launched the first retail mutual fund, “Park Hyeon Joo No.1” in South Korea and The Journal of Investment & Pension described that this fund was a great success.

Mergers and acquisitions of Mirae Asset Financial Group 

Park has grown Mirae Asset Financial Group into an independent financial conglomerate in South Korea by successfully acquiring a number of financial companies with his contrary investment philosophy and insights.

 2004.02 Acquired SK Investment Trust Company, an affiliates of SK Group
 2005.06 Acquired SK Life Insurance, an affiliates of SK Group
 2011.11 Acquired Horizons ETFs, a major ETF player in Canada
 2011.11 Acquired BetaShares, a major ETF player in Australia
 2016.12 Merge and acquisition of Daewoo Securities and Mirae Asset Securities
 2016.12 Acquired KDB asset management company, formerly owned by Korea Development Bank
 2017.07 Invested Vietnamese life insurance company, PRÉVOIR  
 2017.12 Acquired Korea-based PCA Life Insurance
 2018.07 Acquired Global X, US ETF company

Global expansion and presence of Mirae Asset Financial Group 

Founder Park always has in mind to expand the business globally since the early stage, and is regarded as a global forerunner in South Korean financial industry.

Key affiliates 
Mirae Asset Global Investments

Mirae Asset Global Investments is the leading asset management company in South Korea.

Subsidiaries:
 Global X ETFs
 Horizons ETFs

Mirae Asset Securities

Mirae Asset Securities offers services including brokerage service, wealth management, investment banking, and sales & trading. It is listed on KOSPI.

Mirae Asset Life Insurance

Mirae Asset Life Insurance offers life insurance, investment-linked insurance, financial consulting and retirement planning services. It is listed on KOSPI since July 2015.

Mirae Asset Venture Investment 

Mirae Asset Venture Investment Co., Ltd. is a venture capital and private equity company specializing in investment of venture businesses with potential for growth, incubation, buyouts, and cross-border investments. It has been listed on KOSDAQ since March 2019.

See also
 Economy of South Korea

References

External links
 

Companies based in Seoul
South Korean companies established in 1997
Financial services companies established in 1997
Insurance companies of South Korea
Investment banking private equity groups
Investment management companies of South Korea
Exchange-traded funds
Life insurance companies